Valeri Ramshukhovich Bganba (born 26 August 1953) is an Abkhazian politician who served as the Prime Minister of Abkhazia from 18 September 2018 to 23 April 2020 and as the acting President of Abkhazia from 13 January to 23 April 2020. Prior to that he was the Speaker of the People's Assembly of Abkhazia from 2012 until 2017. He was elected as speaker on 3 April 2012 and was succeeded by Valery Kvarchia on 12 April 2017. Bganba became acting President on 1 June 2014, following the resignation of Alexander Ankvab as a result of the 2014 Abkhazian political crisis. On 25 September 2014 he was replaced by Raul Khajimba, the winner of the presidential elections on 24 August.


Early life
Valeri Bganba was born on 26 August 1953 in the village of Bzyb in Gagra District. Between 1971 and 1976 he attended the Kuban Agriculture Institute.

Political career
In 1991, Valeri Bganba was elected to Abkhazia's Supreme Soviet. In 1998, and again in 2001, he was elected Chairman of the Gagra District Assembly. In December 2002 Bganba was appointed Governor of the Gagra District, succeeding Grigori Enik, who had been appointed Head of the State Customs Committee. On 25 May 2006, Bganba was released from office by President Sergei Bagapsh upon his own request, and succeeded by Astamur Ketsba.

In March 2007, Bganba once more became a member of the People's Assembly of Abkhazia when in the general election he won a second round victory in constituency no. 9. In the March 2012 elections, he was one of only five deputies to retain their seat, winning a 52.90% first round victory in constituency no.9 over his only opponent. During the first session of the 5th convocation of the People's Assembly on 3 April, Bganba was elected Speaker, defeating Raul Khajimba by 21 votes to 11. Bganba's predecessor as Speaker Nugzar Ashuba had failed to get re-elected.

Prime minister 
He became the Prime Minister of Abkhazia on 18 September 2018.

Following the resignation of Raul Khajimba on 12 January 2020, Bganba was named the acting President on 13 January. Elections for a successor were also scheduled for 22 March.

See also

References

|-

|-

|-

1953 births
1st convocation of the People's Assembly of Abkhazia
4th convocation of the People's Assembly of Abkhazia
5th convocation of the People's Assembly of Abkhazia
Living people
People from Gagra District
Presidents of Abkhazia
Prime Ministers of Abkhazia
Heads of Gagra District